Aharon April was a Russian artist and contemporary Israeli artist born in Lithuania in 1932. His works are in major public and private collections in Europe, Russia and United States.
48 of his works are in museums around the world.

Biography 
April was born in Vilkaviškis, Lithuania in 1932 to a Jewish family. The family was exiled to Siberia in 1941, where April grew up and got his first impressions of the bleak colors of the northern land. In 1948 he managed to enter the Moscow Art School in Memory of 1905; then was forced to return to Siberia when Soviet authorities launched an anti-Semitic campaign known as “The Doctors’ Plot.” April graduated from an art school in the city of Yakutsk, and pursued his interest in history by attending lectures at a local pedagogical institute. An opportunity to study in Moscow arose after the death of Stalin, and in 1960, April graduated from the Surikov Academy of Fine Arts. He immigrated to Israel in 1972, where he lived till his death on 12 February 2020.

Artistic career 
After his graduation from the Surikov Academy of Fine Arts April took part in many national and international exhibitions. April's first solo exhibition “Behind the Seven Seas” took place at Moscow in 1971. The works centered on the artist's experience of sailing to India on board a trading ship.
A new chapter of April's life and work began in 1972 after he received permission to immigrate to Israel and settled down in Jerusalem. April held many regular personal exhibitions in Israel, North America, Germany, Switzerland, France and Russia
In 1975-76 he held the Chairman position of the Jerusalem artists and sculptors association and was teaching art till 1983 in the University of Haifa, the Hebrew University of Jerusalem and the Bezalel Academy of Arts and Design.
In 1991 April became the Manager of Sa-nur Artists' Village (An artists’ community consisted of immigrants from the Soviet Union), a position he held till 1999. In 2001, April was awarded the Ish-Shalom Foundation Prize for the “Special Achievements in the Development of Art” and in 2005 he was elected as honorary member of the Russian Academy of Arts.

Artistic style 
The art style of Aharon April moves from contemplative figurativism to expressive symbolism. April's paintings impress with their colorful, temperamental riot of colors (Victoria Khan-Magomedova). However, within this chaos, one can find subject and content. Critics (Victoria Khan-Magomedova, Mathy Fisher) noted that Aharon April is one of those artists who can tame the chaos, prompting viewers to formulate answers to the questions posed by the artistic work, and solve the mystery of it. There lies the leading value of the artwork (like Salvador Dali and others). From the seemingly erratic pulsating strokes, one can discover crop faces, figures and even biblical characters (Efgraf Kontchin). Color in April's paintings has special meaning (largely because of extensive experience in watercolor), which combines the finest nuances of color combination of Mediterranean nature and compositions involving biblical and universal themes (Wladimir Prokhorov, Mathy Fisher).

Selected works

Selected Albums and Books 
 "Aharon April", Introduction by Jean Bollack (Paris: Galerie Rambert, 1995).
 "Aharon April", Introduction by Matti Fisher (Moscow: MOMMA, 2002).
 "Aharon April", Introduction by Marina Genkin (Moscow, Scanrus 2007).
 "To Love Is Always Classical..." By Aharon April and Galina Podolsky, Jerusalem 2012, 
 "Diptych Of Destinies" By Galina Podolsky and Aharon April, Jerusalem 2013, .
 "To a mighty hand and honest colors (artists memories)" By Aharon April, Jerusalem 2016,

References 

 Alexander Rozhin (ed.): ''Aharon April Retrospective. Moscow 2007, . Russian/English/Hebrew.
 Aleksandr Deyneka, "Молодое искусство" // Izvestia, 14.09.1958. [in Russian].
 Vladimir Kostin, "Образы жизни..." // Yunost (Moscow), No.10 (1963). [in Russian].
 bio bibliographic dictionary of artists in USSR, 1970, Vol.1, Page. 182.
 Amnon Barzel, "Aharon April" // Haaretz, 5 January 1973. [in Hebrew].
 Meir Ronen, "A master in transit" // Jerusalem Post, 25 July 1975.
 Nizza Flakser, "הנושא כביטוי לרגש" // Davar, 1 August 1975. [in Hebrew].
 Shella Drobkin, "From Russia to Israel with dreams"  // The Montreal Suburban, 8 Nov 1975.
 Bob Garret, "An artist tells…" // Boston Globe, 23 Nov 1975.
 Mirriam Tal, "A Feast for the Eyes" // Yedioth Ahronoth, 4 May 1979. [in Hebrew].
 David Gerstein, "Song of Songs" // Yedioth Ahronoth,  1983. [in Hebrew].
 Jacques Picard, "Fliehendes Licht und zitternde Luft" // Kulturspiegel (Bern), 11 September 1986. [in German].
 April Aharon, "More about Biblical Stones" // Ariel (Jerusalem), No. 2 (1990). [in Hebrew, English, Russian].
 Victor Lupan, "La colonie des artiste" // Figaro magazine (Paris), 12 February 1998.
 Michael Yudson, "Classic of Love" // Vesti (Israeli newspaper), in Russian, 8 June 2002.
 Galina Podolsky, "In the Light of Day" // Vesti (Israeli newspaper), in Russian,  15 June 2002.
 Noa Lea Cohen "Aprils Rain" // Nekuda, No.305 (October 2007). [in Hebrew].
 Victoria Khan-Magomedova "April's blue Bird" //Iskusstvo" N16 (2008)
 Evgraf Kontchin, "Competition with Light" // Kultura (Moscow), 26 June 2008. [in Russian].
 Dmitry Zhilinsky, "Ascendance. A Monolog about Aharon April " // Tretyakov Gallery Journal (Moscow), No.2/19 (2008)

Video
 "Unconscious Reality", 2014.
 "Creation", 2000.
 "Song of Songs", 2001.
 "The Other Side Of The Canvas", 2000.
Link to All 4 videos

External links 
 Aharon April's homepage 

Jewish Israeli artists
Jewish painters
Israeli male painters
1932 births
Soviet painters
2020 deaths
Israeli sculptors
People from Vilkaviškis
Soviet emigrants to Israel
Soviet Jews
Lithuanian Jews
Israeli people of Lithuanian-Jewish descent